Félix Cruz Barbosa Ríos (born 4 April 1961) is a Mexican former professional football defender who played for Mexico in the 1986 FIFA World Cup.

Club career
Cruz began his footballing career in Mexico with Pumas UNAM in 1980. However, having his opportunities limited with Pumas he played in Japan for Nissan Motors where he remained for two seasons.

 Other clubs Cruz played for were Atlante F.C., Tigres UANL, C.F. Monterrey and Toros Neza.

International career
He represented Mexico as a player in the 1986 FIFA World Cup tournaments and earned a total of 51 caps, scoring 1 goal.

References

External links
 
FIFA profile

1961 births
Living people
Footballers from Coahuila
Mexican footballers
Sportspeople from Torreón
Association football defenders
Mexico international footballers
1986 FIFA World Cup players
Club Universidad Nacional footballers
Atlante F.C. footballers
Tigres UANL footballers
C.F. Monterrey players
Toros Neza footballers
Liga MX players
Mexican expatriate footballers
Expatriate footballers in Japan
Mexican expatriate sportspeople in Japan
1991 CONCACAF Gold Cup players